Sara R. Ehrmann (June 14, 1895 – March 18, 1993) was a Boston civic leader who fought against capital punishment both city- and nationwide. Best known for her work establishing the 1951 "Mercy Law" in Massachusetts, which allowed juries to opt out of the death penalty on first-degree murder cases, Ehrmann was an influential leader of the Massachusetts Council for the Abolition of the Death Penalty (1928–1969) and the American League to Abolish Capital Punishment (1949–1969). She launched her career as a direct response to the internationally controversial Sacco and Vanzetti case, which her husband worked on as an assistant defense councilman.

Ehrmann's activism spread to other areas; she was a national membership chairman of the American Jewish Committee, the first president of the League of Women Voters, and a member of the United Prison Association and the Friends of Framingham Reformatory.

Early years
Sara R. Ehrmann was born Sara Emilie Rosenfeld in Bowling Green, Kentucky. She was the daughter of Helen Emelie Rosenfeld and businessman Abe Rosenfeld.

In 1917 Sara married Herbert B. Ehrmann, attorney and founder of the Greater Boston Chapter of the American Jewish Committee. Herbert Ehrmann was an assistant defense councilman for the Sacco and Vanzetti trial, and both he and his wife were very active in civic affairs and the Jewish community.

In 1918 Sara received her bachelor's degree from the University of Rochester while taking additional courses at Smith College. Sara gave birth to her first son Hilmar Bruce Ehrmann in 1918 and her second,  Robert Lincoln Ehrmann, in 1922.

Life and career

From 1927 to 1967, Ehrmann led the fight against the death penalty in Massachusetts. In 1951, Ehrmann had her first major career victory. Under her leadership, Massachusetts law was reconstituted so that it allowed members of the juror to vote for life instead of execution when a person was convicted for first-degree murder. At the time, the death penalty was the mandatory ruling, so this ruling was called "the mercy law," and was her foot in the door toward absolute reform.

Ehrmann in an interview with The Boston Globe: 

I had a firm conviction that it is unnecessary and wrong to take lives in punishment for crime. It is a great source of evil in the community.

In 1972, the death penalty was abolished due to a Supreme Court ruling. However, just four years later, the same ruling was altered so that capital punishment was allowable if certain protective measures were considered.

It wasn't until 1980 that the ruling was again reviewed and overturned by the Massachusetts Supreme Judicial Court as both unconstitutional and "impermissible in the commonwealth".

Death
Ehrmann resided in Brookline until she died of natural causes at the age of 97 on March 18, 1993. Her body rests in Temple Israel Cemetery in Wakefield, Massachusetts.

Legacy and influence
As a leading figure on the Massachusetts Council for the Abolition of the Death Penalty, Ehrmann continuously made the efforts of the organization public as well as personally appealed to Massachusetts governors and councillors alike. Due to her tireless efforts, Massachusetts' last execution occurred in 1947.

Ehrmann in an interview with The Boston Globe: 

To every possible question that I've asked myself to justify the death penalty, I've never found a satisfactory answer.

In 1967, Ehrmann retired as Council President, but stayed on as a member of its board. It was her hope that more young and capable abolitionists would take her place and continue her efforts.

References

1895 births
1993 deaths
American anti–death penalty activists
Capital punishment in Massachusetts